Jennifer Johanna Åkerman (born 10 July 1989) is a Swedish model, blogger, songwriter and singer. She is the youngest sister of actress Malin Åkerman.

At the age of eighteen Jennifer Åkerman moved to Los Angeles and studied at college. She tried acting but was discovered by a modeling agency and has modelled for several brands and commercials. The modeling brought her to New York City and more modeling work. At the same time, she started singing for the band Bella Tech, before forming the duo Bloke & Bird with Lorenzo Jansson Kilman. In 2022, she released her solo album Monster under the name Final Child.

Åkerman participated as a celebrity dancer in the celebrity dancing show Let's Dance 2013 which was broadcast on TV4. She has blogged for Veckorevyn, Chic and now Metro Mode.

References

External links

Living people
1989 births
Swedish emigrants to the United States
Swedish female models
Swedish women singer-songwriters
Swedish singer-songwriters
Models from Los Angeles
Musicians from Stockholm
21st-century Swedish singers
21st-century Swedish women singers